Dr. Strangelove or: How I Learned to Stop Worrying and Love the Bomb, known simply and more commonly as Dr. Strangelove, is a 1964 satirical black comedy film that satirizes the Cold War fears of a nuclear conflict between the Soviet Union and the United States. The film was directed, produced, and co-written by Stanley Kubrick and stars Peter Sellers, George C. Scott, Sterling Hayden, and Slim Pickens. The film is loosely based on Peter George's thriller novel Red Alert (1958).

The story concerns an unhinged United States Air Force general who orders a pre-emptive nuclear attack on the Soviet Union. It separately follows the President of the United States, his advisors, the Joint Chiefs of Staff and a Royal Air Force exchange officer as they attempt to prevent the crew of a B-52 (who were following orders from the general) from bombing the Soviet Union and starting a nuclear war.

The film is often considered one of the best comedies ever made, as well as one of the greatest films of all time. In 1998, the American Film Institute ranked it twenty-sixth in its list of the best American movies (in the 2007 edition, the film ranked thirty-ninth), and in 2000, it was listed as number three on its list of the funniest American films. In 1989, the United States Library of Congress included Dr. Strangelove as one of the first 25 films selected for preservation in the National Film Registry for being "culturally, historically, or aesthetically significant".

Plot 
United States Air Force Brigadier General Jack D. Ripper is commander of Burpelson Air Force Base, which houses the 843rd Bomb Wing, flying B-52 bombers armed with hydrogen bombs. The planes are on airborne alert two hours from their targets inside the USSR.

General Ripper orders his executive officer, Group Captain Lionel Mandrake (an exchange officer from the Royal Air Force), to put the base on alert, confiscate all privately owned radios from base personnel and issue "Wing Attack Plan R" to the patrolling bombers. All the aircraft commence attack flights on the USSR and set their radios to allow communications only through their CRM 114 discriminators, which are designed to accept only communications preceded by a secret three-letter code known only to General Ripper. Happening upon a radio that had been missed earlier and hearing normal civilian broadcasting, Mandrake realizes that no attack order has been issued by the Pentagon and tries to stop Ripper, who locks them both in his office. Ripper tells Mandrake that he believes the Soviets have been fluoridating American water supplies to pollute the "precious bodily fluids" of Americans. Mandrake realizes Ripper has become insane.

In the War Room at the Pentagon, General Buck Turgidson briefs President Merkin Muffley and other officers about how "Plan R" enables a senior officer to launch a retaliatory nuclear attack on the Soviets if all superiors have been killed in a first strike on the United States. It would take two days to try every CRM code combination to issue a recall order, so Muffley orders the U.S. Army to storm the base and arrest General Ripper. Turgidson, noting the slim odds of recalling the planes in time, then proposes that Muffley not only let the attack continue but send reinforcements. According to an unofficial study, this would result in "modest and acceptable civilian casualties" from the "badly damaged and uncoordinated" Soviet military that would remain after the initial attack. Muffley refuses this plan and instead brings Soviet ambassador Alexei de Sadeski into the War Room to telephone Soviet Premier Dimitri Kissov on the "hotline". Muffley warns the Premier of the impending attack and offers to reveal the targets, flight plans and defensive systems of the bombers so that the Soviets can protect themselves.

After a heated discussion with the Premier, the ambassador informs President Muffley that the Soviet Union created a doomsday machine as a nuclear deterrent; it consists of many buried bombs jacketed with "cobalt–thorium G", which are set to detonate automatically should any nuclear attack strike the country. The resulting nuclear fallout would then engulf the planet for 93 years, rendering the Earth's surface uninhabitable. The device cannot be deactivated, as it is programmed to explode if any such attempt is made. The President's wheelchair-using scientific advisor, former German Nazi Dr. Strangelove, points out that such a doomsday machine would only be an effective deterrent if everyone knew about it; Alexei replies that the Soviet Premier had planned to reveal its existence to the world the following week at the Party Congress.

U.S. Army troops arrive at Burpelson and battle with the garrison. After General Ripper commits suicide, Mandrake identifies Ripper's CRM code from his desk blotter and relays it to the Pentagon. Using the code, Strategic Air Command successfully recalls all of the bombers except for one, commanded by Major T. J. "King" Kong, due to the radio equipment being damaged in a missile attack. The Soviets attempt to find it, but Kong has the bomber attack a closer target due to dwindling fuel. As the plane approaches the new target, a Soviet ICBM site, the crew is unable to open the damaged bomb bay doors. Kong enters the bay and repairs the electrical wiring while straddling an H-bomb, whereupon the doors open and the bomb is dropped. Kong joyously hoots and waves his cowboy hat as he rides the falling bomb to his death.

Back in the War Room, Dr. Strangelove recommends that the President gather several hundred thousand people to live in deep underground mines where the radiation will not penetrate. He suggests a 10:1 female-to-male ratio for a breeding program to repopulate the Earth once the radiation has subsided, a plan which gathers enthusiastic support from the all-male command staff. Worried that the Soviets will do the same, Turgidson warns about a "mineshaft gap" while Alexei secretly photographs the War Room. Dr. Strangelove declares he has a plan, then suddenly rises from his wheelchair and exclaims, "Mein Führer, I can walk!" The film cuts to a montage of nuclear explosions, accompanied by Vera Lynn's rendition of the song "We'll Meet Again".

Cast 
 Peter Sellers as:
 Group captain Lionel Mandrake, a British RAF exchange officer
 Merkin Muffley, the President of the United States
 Dr. Strangelove, the wheelchair-using nuclear war expert and former Nazi named Merkwürdigliebe, who has alien hand syndrome
 George C. Scott as General Buck Turgidson, Chairman of the Joint Chiefs of Staff
 Sterling Hayden as Brigadier General Jack D. Ripper, paranoid commander of Burpelson Air Force Base, which is part of the Strategic Air Command.
 Keenan Wynn as Colonel "Bat" Guano, the Army officer who finds Mandrake and Ripper
 Jack Creley as Mr. Staines, National Security Advisor
 Slim Pickens as Major T. J. "King" Kong, the B-52 bomber's commander and pilot
 Peter Bull as Soviet Ambassador Alexei de Sadeski
 James Earl Jones as Lieutenant Lothar Zogg, the B-52's bombardier (film debut)
 Tracy Reed as Miss Scott, General Turgidson's secretary and mistress, the film's only female character. She also appears as "Miss Foreign Affairs", the Playboy Playmate in Playboy June 1962 issue, which Major Kong is shown perusing at one point.
 Shane Rimmer as Capt. Ace Owens, the co-pilot of the B-52

Peter Sellers's multiple roles 

Columbia Pictures agreed to finance the film if Peter Sellers played at least four major roles. The condition stemmed from the studio's opinion that much of the success of Kubrick's previous film Lolita (1962) was based on Sellers's performance in which his single character assumes a number of identities. Sellers had also played three roles in The Mouse That Roared (1959). Kubrick accepted the demand, later saying that "such crass and grotesque stipulations are the sine qua non of the motion-picture business."

Sellers ended up playing three of the four roles written for him. He had been expected to play Air Force Major T. J. "King" Kong, the B-52 aircraft commander, but from the beginning Sellers was reluctant. He felt his workload was too heavy and he worried he would not properly portray the character's Texan English accent. Kubrick pleaded with him and he asked the screenwriter Terry Southern (who had been raised in Texas) to record a tape with Kong's lines spoken in the correct accent, which he practiced using Southern's tapes. But after the start of shooting in the aircraft Sellers sprained his ankle and could no longer work in the cramped aircraft mockup.

Sellers is said to have improvised much of his dialogue, with Kubrick incorporating the ad-libs into the written screenplay so that the improvised lines became part of the canonical screenplay, a practice known as retroscripting.

Group Captain Lionel Mandrake 
According to film critic Alexander Walker, the author of biographies of both Sellers and Kubrick, the role of Group Captain Lionel Mandrake was the easiest of the three for Sellers to play, since he was aided by his experience of mimicking his superiors while serving in the RAF during World War II. There is also a heavy resemblance to Sellers' friend and occasional co-star Terry-Thomas and the prosthetic-limbed RAF flying ace Sir Douglas Bader.

President Merkin Muffley 
For his performance as President Merkin Muffley, Sellers assumed a Midwestern American English accent. Sellers drew inspiration for the role from Adlai Stevenson, a former Illinois governor who was the Democratic candidate for the 1952 and 1956 presidential elections and the U.N. ambassador during the Cuban Missile Crisis.

In early takes, Sellers faked cold symptoms to emphasize the character's apparent weakness. That caused frequent laughter among the film crew, ruining several takes. Kubrick ultimately found this comic portrayal inappropriate, feeling that Muffley should be a serious character. In later takes Sellers played the role straight, though the President's cold is still evident in several scenes.

Dr. Strangelove 

Dr. Strangelove is a former Nazi and scientist, suggesting Operation Paperclip, the US effort to recruit top German technical talent at the end of World War II. He serves as President Muffley's scientific adviser in the War Room. When General Turgidson wonders aloud to Mr. Staines (Jack Creley), what kind of name "Strangelove" is, possibly a "Kraut name", Staines responds that Strangelove's original German surname was Merkwürdigliebe ("Strange love" in German) and that "he changed it when he became a citizen". Strangelove accidentally addresses the president as Mein Führer twice in the film. Dr. Strangelove did not appear in the book Red Alert.

The character is an amalgamation of RAND Corporation strategist Herman Kahn, rocket scientist Wernher von Braun (a central figure in Nazi Germany's rocket development program recruited to the US after the war), and Edward Teller, the "father of the hydrogen bomb". It has been claimed that the character was based on Henry Kissinger, but Kubrick and Sellers denied this; Sellers said: "Strangelove was never modeled after Kissinger—that's a popular misconception. It was always Wernher von Braun." Furthermore, Henry Kissinger points out in his memoirs that at the time of the writing of Dr. Strangelove, he was a little-known academic.

The wheelchair-using Strangelove furthers a Kubrick trope of the menacing, seated antagonist, first depicted in Lolita through the character "Dr. Zaempf". Strangelove's accent was influenced by that of Austrian-American photographer Weegee, who worked for Kubrick as a special photographic effects consultant. Strangelove's appearance echoes the mad scientist archetype as seen in the character Rotwang in Fritz Lang's film Metropolis (1927). Sellers's Strangelove takes from Rotwang the single black gloved hand (which, in Rotwang's case is mechanical, because of a lab accident), the wild hair and, most important, his ability to avoid being controlled by political power. According to Alexander Walker, Sellers improvised Dr. Strangelove's lapse into the Nazi salute, borrowing one of Kubrick's black leather gloves for the uncontrollable hand that makes the gesture. Dr. Strangelove apparently has alien hand syndrome. Kubrick wore the gloves on the set to avoid being burned when handling hot lights, and Sellers, recognizing the potential connection to Lang's work, found them to be menacing.

Slim Pickens as Major T. J. "King" Kong 

Slim Pickens, an established character actor and veteran of many Western films, was eventually chosen to replace Sellers as Major Kong after Sellers' injury. Terry Southern's biographer, Lee Hill, said the part was originally written with John Wayne in mind, and that Wayne was offered the role after Sellers was injured, but he immediately turned it down. Dan Blocker of the Bonanza western television series was approached to play the part, but according to Southern, Blocker's agent rejected the script as being "too pinko". Kubrick then recruited Pickens, whom he knew from his brief involvement in a Marlon Brando western film project that was eventually filmed as One-Eyed Jacks.

His fellow actor James Earl Jones recalls, "He was Major Kong on and off the set—he didn't change a thing—his temperament, his language, his behavior." Pickens was not told that the movie was a black comedy, and he was only given the script for scenes he was in, to get him to play it "straight".

Kubrick's biographer John Baxter explained, in the documentary Inside the Making of Dr. Strangelove:

Pickens, who had previously played only supporting and character roles, said that his appearance as Maj. Kong greatly improved his career. He later commented, "After Dr. Strangelove, my salary jumped five times, and assistant directors started saying 'Hey, Slim' instead of 'Hey, you'."

George C. Scott as General Buck Turgidson 

George C. Scott played the role of General Buck Turgidson, the Chairman of the Joint Chiefs of Staff. In this capacity General Turgidson was the nation's highest-ranking military officer and the principal military advisor to the President and the National Security Council. He is seen during most of the movie advising President Muffley on the best steps to take in order to stop the fleet of B-52 Stratofortresses that was deployed by Brigadier General Jack D. Ripper to drop nuclear bombs on Soviet soil.

According to James Earl Jones, Kubrick tricked Scott into playing the role of Gen. Turgidson far more ridiculously than Scott was comfortable doing. Kubrick talked Scott into doing over-the-top "practice" takes, which Kubrick told Scott would never be used, as a way to warm up for the "real" takes. Kubrick used these takes in the final film, causing Scott to swear never to work with Kubrick again.

During the filming, Kubrick and Scott had different opinions regarding certain scenes, but Kubrick got Scott to conform largely by repeatedly beating him at chess, which they played frequently on the set. Scott, a skilled player himself, later said that while he and Kubrick may not have always seen eye to eye, he respected Kubrick immensely for his skill at chess.

Production

Novel and screenplay 
Stanley Kubrick started with nothing but a vague idea to make a thriller about a nuclear accident that built on the widespread Cold War fear for survival. While doing research, Kubrick gradually became aware of the subtle and paradoxical "balance of terror" between nuclear powers. At Kubrick's request, Alastair Buchan (the head of the Institute for Strategic Studies) recommended the thriller novel Red Alert by Peter George. Kubrick was impressed with the book, which had also been praised by game theorist and future Nobel Prize in Economics winner Thomas Schelling in an article written for the Bulletin of the Atomic Scientists and reprinted in The Observer, and immediately bought the film rights. In 2006, Schelling wrote that conversations between Kubrick, Schelling, and George in late 1960 about a treatment of Red Alert updated with intercontinental missiles eventually led to the making of the film.

In collaboration with George, Kubrick started writing a screenplay based on the book. While writing the screenplay, they benefited from some brief consultations with Schelling and later, Herman Kahn. In following the tone of the book, Kubrick originally intended to film the story as a serious drama. However, he began to see comedy inherent in the idea of mutual assured destruction as he wrote the first draft. He later said:

Among the titles that Kubrick considered for the film were Dr. Doomsday or: How to Start World War III Without Even Trying, Dr. Strangelove's Secret Uses of Uranus, and Wonderful Bomb. After deciding to make the film a black comedy, Kubrick brought in Terry Southern as a co-writer in late 1962. The choice was influenced by reading Southern's comic novel The Magic Christian, which Kubrick had received as a gift from Peter Sellers, and which itself became a Sellers film in 1969. Southern made important contributions to the film, but his role led to a rift between Kubrick and Peter George; after Life magazine published a photo-essay on Southern in August 1964 which implied that Southern had been the script's principal author—a misperception neither Kubrick nor Southern did much to dispel— George wrote a letter to the magazine, published in its September 1964 issue, in which he pointed out that he had both written the film's source novel and collaborated on various incarnations of the script over a period of ten months, whereas "Southern was briefly employed ... to do some additional rewriting for Kubrick and myself and fittingly received a screenplay credit in  behind Mr. Kubrick and myself."

Sets and filming 

Dr. Strangelove was filmed at Shepperton Studios, near London, as Sellers was in the middle of a divorce at the time and unable to leave England. The sets occupied three main sound stages: the Pentagon War Room, the B-52 Stratofortress bomber and the last one containing both the motel room and General Ripper's office and outside corridor.  The studio's buildings were also used as the Air Force base exterior. The film's set design was done by Ken Adam, the production designer of several James Bond films (at the time he had already worked on Dr. No). The black and white cinematography was by Gilbert Taylor, and the film was edited by Anthony Harvey and an uncredited Kubrick. The original musical score for the film was composed by Laurie Johnson and the special effects were by Wally Veevers. The opening theme is an instrumental version of "Try a Little Tenderness." The theme of the chorus from the bomb run scene is a modification of "When Johnny Comes Marching Home." Sellers and Kubrick got along well during the film's production and shared a love of photography.

For the War Room, Ken Adam first designed a two-level set which Kubrick initially liked, only to decide later that it was not what he wanted. Adam next began work on the design that was used in the film, an expressionist set that was compared with The Cabinet of Dr. Caligari and Fritz Lang's Metropolis. One side of the room was covered with gigantic strategic maps reflecting in a shiny black floor inspired by dance scenes in Fred Astaire films. In the middle of the room there was a large circular table lit from above by a circle of lamps, suggesting a poker table. Kubrick insisted that the table would be covered with green baize (although this could not be seen in the black and white film) to reinforce the actors' impression that they are playing 'a game of poker for the fate of the world.' Kubrick asked Adam to build the set ceiling in concrete to force the director of photography to use only the on-set lights from the circle of lamps. Moreover, each lamp in the circle of lights was carefully placed and tested until Kubrick was happy with the result.

Lacking cooperation from the Pentagon in the making of the film, the set designers reconstructed the aircraft cockpit to the best of their ability by comparing the cockpit of a B-29 Superfortress and a single photograph of the cockpit of a B-52 and relating this to the geometry of the B-52's fuselage. The B-52 was state-of-the-art in the 1960s, and its cockpit was off-limits to the film crew. When some United States Air Force personnel were invited to view the reconstructed B-52 cockpit, they said that "it was absolutely correct, even to the little black box which was the CRM." It was so accurate that Kubrick was concerned about whether Adam's team had carried out all its research legally.

In several shots of the B-52 flying over the polar ice en route to Russia, the shadow of the actual camera plane, a Boeing B-17 Flying Fortress, is visible on the icecap below. The B-52 was a scale model composited into the Arctic footage, which was sped up to create a sense of jet speed. Home movie footage included in Inside the Making of Dr. Strangelove on the 2001 Special Edition DVD release of the film shows clips of the B-17 with a cursive "Dr. Strangelove" painted over the rear entry hatch on the right side of the fuselage.

In 1967, some of the flying footage from Dr. Strangelove was re-used in The Beatles' television film Magical Mystery Tour. As told by editor Roy Benson in the BBC Radio Documentary Celluloid Beatles, the production team of Magical Mystery Tour lacked footage to cover the sequence for the song "Flying." Benson had access to the aerial footage filmed for the B-52 sequences of Dr. Strangelove, which was stored at Shepperton Studios. The use of the footage prompted Kubrick to call Benson to complain.

Fail Safe 
Red Alert author Peter George collaborated on the screenplay with Kubrick and satirist Terry Southern. Red Alert was more solemn than its film version, and it did not include the character Dr. Strangelove, though the main plot and technical elements were quite similar. A novelization of the actual film, rather than a reprint of the original novel, was published by Peter George, based on an early draft in which the narrative is bookended by the account of aliens, who, having arrived at a desolated Earth, try to piece together what has happened. It was reissued in October 2015 by Candy Jar Books, featuring never-before-published material on Strangelove's early career.

During the filming of Dr. Strangelove, Stanley Kubrick learned that Fail Safe, a film with a similar theme, was being produced. Although Fail Safe was to be an ultrarealistic thriller, Kubrick feared that its plot resemblance would damage his film's box office potential, especially if it were released first. Indeed, the novel Fail-Safe (on which the film is based) is so similar to Red Alert that Peter George sued on charges of plagiarism and settled out of court.
What worried Kubrick the most was that Fail Safe boasted the acclaimed director Sidney Lumet and the first-rate dramatic actors Henry Fonda as the American president and Walter Matthau as the advisor to the Pentagon, Professor Groeteschele. Kubrick decided to throw a legal wrench into Fail Safes production gears. Lumet recalled in the documentary Inside the Making of Dr. Strangelove: "We started casting. Fonda was already set ... which of course meant a big commitment in terms of money. I was set, Walter [Bernstein, the screenwriter] was set ... And suddenly, this lawsuit arrived, filed by Stanley Kubrick and Columbia Pictures."

Kubrick argued that Fail Safes own source novel Fail-Safe (1962) had been plagiarized from Peter George's Red Alert, to which Kubrick owned creative rights. He pointed out unmistakable similarities in intentions between the characters Groeteschele and Strangelove. The plan worked, and the suit was settled out of court, with the agreement that Columbia Pictures, which had financed and was distributing Strangelove, also buy Fail Safe, which had been an independently financed production. Kubrick insisted that the studio release his movie first, and Fail Safe opened eight months after Dr. Strangelove, to critical acclaim but mediocre ticket sales.

Ending 
The end of the film shows Dr. Strangelove exclaiming, "Mein Führer, I can walk!" before cutting to footage of nuclear explosions, with Vera Lynn and her audience singing "We'll Meet Again". This footage comes from nuclear tests such as shot "Baker" of Operation Crossroads at Bikini Atoll, the Trinity test, a test from Operation Sandstone and the hydrogen bomb tests from Operation Redwing and Operation Ivy. In some shots, old warships (such as the German heavy cruiser Prinz Eugen), which were used as targets, are plainly visible. In others, the smoke trails of rockets used to create a calibration backdrop can be seen. Former Goon Show writer and friend of Sellers Spike Milligan was credited with suggesting Vera Lynn's song for the ending.

Original ending 

It was originally planned for the film to end with a scene that depicted everyone in the War Room involved in a pie fight. Accounts vary as to why the pie fight was cut. In a 1969 interview, Kubrick said, "I decided it was farce and not consistent with the satiric tone of the rest of the film." Critic Alexander Walker observed that "the cream pies were flying around so thickly that people lost definition, and you couldn't really say whom you were looking at." Nile Southern, son of screenwriter Terry Southern, suggested the fight was intended to be less jovial: "Since they were laughing, it was unusable, because instead of having that totally black, which would have been amazing, like, this blizzard, which in a sense is metaphorical for all of the missiles that are coming, as well, you just have these guys having a good old time. So, as Kubrick later said, 'it was a disaster of Homeric proportions.

Effects of the Kennedy assassination on the film 
A first test screening of the film was scheduled for November 22, 1963, the day of the assassination of John F. Kennedy. The film was just weeks from its scheduled premiere, but because of the assassination, the release was delayed until late January 1964, as it was felt that the public was in no mood for such a film any sooner.

During post-production, one line by Slim Pickens, "a fella could have a pretty good weekend in Dallas with all that stuff", was dubbed to change "Dallas" to "Vegas", since Dallas was where Kennedy was killed. The original reference to Dallas survives in the English audio of the French-subtitled version of the film.

The assassination also serves as another possible reason that the pie-fight scene was cut. In the scene, after Muffley takes a pie in the face, General Turgidson exclaims: "Gentlemen! Our gallant young president has been struck down in his prime!" Editor Anthony Harvey stated that the scene "would have stayed, except that Columbia Pictures were horrified, and thought it would offend the president's family." Kubrick and others have said that the scene had already been cut before preview night because it was inconsistent with the rest of the film.

Rerelease in 1994 
In 1994, the film was re-released. While the 1964 release used a 1.85:1 aspect ratio, the new print was in the slightly squarer 1.66:1 (5:3) ratio that Kubrick had originally intended.

Themes

Satirizing the Cold War 
Dr. Strangelove ridicules nuclear war planning. It takes shots at numerous contemporary Cold War attitudes such as the "missile gap" but it primarily directs its satire on the theory of mutually assured destruction (MAD), in which each side is supposed to be deterred from a nuclear war by the prospect of a universal cataclysm regardless of who "won". Military strategist and former physicist Herman Kahn, in the book On Thermonuclear War (1960), used the theoretical example of a "doomsday machine" to illustrate the limitations of MAD, which was developed by John von Neumann.

The concept of such a machine is consistent with MAD doctrine when it is logically pursued to its conclusion. It thus worried Kahn that the military might like the idea of a doomsday machine and build one. Kahn, a leading critic of MAD and the Eisenhower administration's doctrine of massive retaliation upon the slightest provocation by the USSR, considered MAD to be foolish bravado, and urged America to instead plan for proportionality, and thus even a limited nuclear war. With this reasoning, Kahn became one of the architects of the flexible response doctrine which, while superficially resembling MAD, allowed for the possibility of responding to a limited nuclear strike with a proportional, or calibrated, return of fire (see Conflict escalation).

Kahn educated Kubrick on the concept of the semi-realistic "cobalt-thorium G" doomsday machine, and then Kubrick used the concept for the film. Kahn in his writings and talks would often come across as cold and calculating, for example, with his use of the term "megadeaths" and in his willingness to estimate how many human lives the United States could lose and still rebuild economically. Kahn's dispassionate attitude towards millions of deaths is reflected in Turgidson's remark to the president about the outcome of a preemptive nuclear war: "Mr. President, I'm not saying we wouldn't get our hair mussed. But I do say no more than ten to twenty million killed, tops, uh, depending on the breaks." Turgidson has a binder that is labelled "World Targets in Megadeaths," a term coined in 1953 by Kahn and popularized in his 1960 book On Thermonuclear War.

The fallout-shelter-network proposal mentioned in the film, with its inherently high radiation protection characteristics, has similarities and contrasts to that of the real Swiss civil defense network. Switzerland has an overcapacity of nuclear fallout shelters for the country's population size, and by law, new homes must still be built with a fallout shelter. If the US did that, it would violate the spirit of MAD and, according to MAD adherents, allegedly destabilize the situation because the US could launch a first strike and its population would largely survive a retaliatory second strike (see MAD § Theory).

To rebut early 1960s novels and Hollywood films like Fail-Safe and Dr. Strangelove, which raised questions about US control over nuclear weapons, the Air Force produced a documentary film, SAC Command Post, to demonstrate its responsiveness to presidential command and its tight control over nuclear weapons. However, later academic research into declassified documents showed that U.S. military commanders had been given presidentially-authorized pre-delegation for the use of nuclear weapons during the early Cold War, showing that this aspect of the film's plot was plausible.

The characters of Buck Turgidson and Jack Ripper both deride the real-life Gen. Curtis LeMay of the Strategic Air Command.

Sexual themes 
In the months following the film's release, director Stanley Kubrick received a fan letter from Legrace G. Benson of the Department of History of Art at Cornell University interpreting the film as being sexually-layered. The director wrote back to Benson and confirmed the interpretation, "Seriously, you are the first one who seems to have noticed the sexual framework from intromission (the planes going in) to the last spasm (Kong's ride down and detonation at target)."

Release 

The film was a popular success, earning US$4,420,000 in rentals in North America during its initial theatrical release.

Reception

Critical response 
Dr. Strangelove is Kubrick's highest-rated film on Rotten Tomatoes, holding a 98% approval rating based on 96 reviews, with an average rating of 9.10/10. The site's summary states that "Stanley Kubrick's brilliant Cold War satire remains as funny and razor-sharp today as it was in 1964." The film also holds a score of 97 out of 100 on Metacritic, based on 32 reviews, indicating "universal acclaim." The film is ranked number 7 in the All-Time High Scores chart of Metacritic's Video/DVD section. It was selected for preservation in the United States National Film Registry.

Dr. Strangelove is on Roger Ebert's list of The Great Movies, and he described it as "arguably the best political satire of the century". One of the most celebrated of all film comedies, in 1998, Time Out conducted a reader's poll and Dr. Strangelove was voted the 47th greatest film of all time. Entertainment Weekly voted it at No. 14 on their list of 100 Greatest Movies of All Time. in 2002, it was ranked as the 5th best film in Sight & Sound poll of best films. John Patterson of The Guardian wrote, "There had been nothing in comedy like Dr Strangelove ever before. All the gods before whom the America of the stolid, paranoid 50s had genuflected—the Bomb, the Pentagon, the National Security State, the President himself, Texan masculinity and the alleged Commie menace of water-fluoridation—went into the wood-chipper and never got the same respect ever again." It is also listed as number 26 on Empire's 500 Greatest Movies of All Time, and in 2010 it was listed by Time magazine as one of the 100 best films since the publication's inception in 1923. The Writers Guild of America ranked its screenplay the 12th best ever written.

In 2000, readers of Total Film magazine voted it the 24th greatest comedic film of all time. The film ranked 42nd in BBCs 2015 list of the 100 greatest American films. The film was selected as the 2nd best comedy of all time in a poll of 253 film critics from 52 countries conducted by the BBC in 2017.

Studio response 
Columbia Pictures' early reaction to Dr. Strangelove was anything but enthusiastic. In "Notes From The War Room", in the summer 1994 issue of Grand Street magazine, co-screenwriter Terry Southern recalled that, as production neared the end, "It was about this time that word began to reach us, reflecting concern as to the nature of the film in production. Was it anti-American? Or just anti-military? And the jackpot question: Was it, in fact, anti-American to whatever extent it was anti-military?"

Southern recalled how Kubrick grew concerned about seeming apathy and distancing by studio heads Abe Schneider and Mo Rothman, and by Columbia's characterization of the film as "just a zany, novelty flick which did not reflect the views of the corporation in any way." Southern noted that Rothman was in "prominent attendance" at a ceremony in 1989 when the Library of Congress announced it as one of the first 25 films on the National Film Registry.

Accolades 

The film ranked No. 32 on TV Guides list of the 50 Greatest Movies on TV (and Video).

American Film Institute included the film as #26 in AFI's 100 Years...100 Movies, #3 in AFI's 100 Years...100 Laughs, #64 in AFI's 100 Years...100 Movie Quotes ("Gentlemen, you can't fight in here! This is the War Room!") and #39 in AFI's 100 Years...100 Movies (10th Anniversary Edition).

Potential sequel 
In 1995, Kubrick enlisted Terry Southern to script a sequel titled Son of Strangelove. Kubrick had Terry Gilliam in mind to direct. The script was never completed, but index cards laying out the story's basic structure were found among Southern's papers after he died in October 1995. It was set largely in underground bunkers, where Dr. Strangelove had taken refuge with a group of women.

In 2013, Gilliam commented, "I was told after Kubrick died—by someone who had been dealing with him—that he had been interested in trying to do another Strangelove with me directing. I never knew about that until after he died but I would have loved to."

See also 
 CRM 114 (fictional device)
 Dead Hand (nuclear war)
 List of films considered the best
 Operation Paperclip—OSS program used to recruit scientists from Nazi Germany
 Politics in fiction
 Stanley Kubrick Archive
 Cobalt bomb
 Special Atomic Demolition Munition-type of nuclear bomb that can be strapped to a parachuter.

References

Further reading 
 Ellsberg, Daniel  "The Doomsday Machine"  New York: Bloomsbury Publishing, 2017  .
 Dolan, Edward F., Jr. Hollywood Goes to War. London: Bison Books, 1985. .
 Hardwick, Jack and Schnepf, Ed. "A Viewer's Guide to Aviation Movies." The Making of the Great Aviation Films, General Aviation Series, Volume 2, 1989.
 
 Oriss, Bruce. When Hollywood Ruled the Skies: The Aviation Film Classics of World War II. Hawthorne, California: Aero Associates Inc., 1984. .

External links 

 Dr. Strangelove essay by Wheeler Winston Dixon at National Film Registry 
 Dr. Strangelove essay by Daniel Eagan in America's Film Legacy: The Authoritative Guide to the Landmark Movies in the National Film Registry, A&C Black, 2010 , pages 598-600 
 
 
 
 
 
 "Checkup with Dr. Strangelove" by Terry Southern
 Don't Panic covers Dr. Strangelove (archived)
 Continuity transcript
 "Commentary on Dr. Strangelove by Brian Siano
 "Last Secrets of Strangelove Revealed" by Grant B. Stillman
 Study Guide by Dan Lindley. See also: longer version
 Annotated bibliography on Dr. Strangelove from the Alsos Digital Library
 "Dr. Strangelove: The Darkest Room"—an essay by David Bromwich at the Criterion Collection
   Ann Hornaday, "The 34 best political movies ever made" The Washington Post (Jan. 23, 2020), ranked No. 6

1960s black comedy films
1960s political films
1960s satirical films
1964 films
1964 war films
Films about World War III
American black comedy films
American black-and-white films
American political films
American political satire films
American satirical films
Anti-nuclear films
Anti-war comedy films
Apocalyptic films
Articles containing video clips
Best British Film BAFTA Award winners
Best Film BAFTA Award winners
British black comedy films
British black-and-white films
British political films
British political satire films
British satirical films
Cold War aviation films
Cold War films
Columbia Pictures films
Strangelove, Dr.
Films about fictional presidents of the United States
Films about nuclear war and weapons
Films about the United States Air Force
Films based on British novels
Films based on military novels
Films directed by Stanley Kubrick
Films produced by Stanley Kubrick
Films scored by Laurie Johnson
Films set in the Arctic
Films set in Virginia
Films set on airplanes
Films shot at Shepperton Studios
Films shot in England
Films shot in Greenland
Films with screenplays by Stanley Kubrick
Films with screenplays by Terry Southern
Hugo Award for Best Dramatic Presentation winning works
Mad scientist films
Military humor in film
United States National Film Registry films
1964 drama films
1960s English-language films
1960s American films
1960s British films